I TALK TO STRANGERS (ITTS)  is a registered 501(c)(3) non-profit organization from the United States and a global social movement that unites various ethnic, racial, political, and socio-economic groups through conversation. I TALK TO STRANGERS was founded on 12 February 2012 with the mission to become a global facilitator of conversations that connect diverse minds and brings peace and understanding among diverse cultures and backgrounds.

The purpose of the ITTS Foundation, Inc. is to support the mission of the movement by creating programs and partnerships with organizations that promote enriching dialogue and positive collaborations among strangers. These conversations are geared to give individuals increased opportunities, experiences, and understandings about the world and the people around them.

The foundation creates events and partnerships with the aim of promoting dialogue and collaborations among strangers. The foundation is governed by an independent board of directors. The I Talk to Strangers Foundation was founded by Robbie Stokes, Jr., a former Washington, D.C. event coordinator for a congressional delegate to the United States House of Representatives.

I TALK TO STRANGERS Documentary (2019) 
"The world's first film about strangers, funded by strangers" about young congressional staffer, who risks it all to embark on a journey of faith to unite various ethical, racial, political, and socio-economic groups through conversation.

References

External links
 I TALK TO STRANGERS® Documentary on KickStarter
 

Brevard County, Florida
Non-profit organizations based in Washington, D.C.